Mahmoud Farahmand (born 15 September 1979) is a Norwegian politician.

He was elected representative to the Storting from the constituency of Telemark for the period 2021–2025, for the Conservative Party. He was deputy representative to the Storting 2017–2021.

References

1979 births
Living people
Conservative Party (Norway) politicians
Politicians from Telemark
Members of the Storting